The Penguin is the working title for an upcoming American television miniseries created by Lauren LeFranc for the streaming service HBO Max, based on the DC Comics character of the same name. It is a spin-off to the film The Batman (2022), exploring the Penguin's rise to power in Gotham City's criminal underworld. The series is produced by 6th & Idaho, DC Studios, and Dylan Clark Productions in association with Warner Bros. Television Studios, with LeFranc serving as showrunner.

Colin Farrell stars as the title character, reprising his role from The Batman, alongside Cristin Milioti. Early development on a The Batman spin-off featuring Penguin began by September 2021, with LeFranc attached as writer and Farrell soon confirmed to be reprising his role. The series was ordered by HBO Max shortly after the film's release in March 2022, and Craig Zobel joined to direct the first three episodes of the series by that October. Filming began in March 2023 in New York City and will last until mid-2023.

The Penguin will be released on HBO Max and will consist of eight episodes.

Premise 
Taking place one week following the events of The Batman (2022), the series explores the rise to power of Oswald "Oz" Cobblepot / Penguin in Gotham City's criminal underworld.

Cast and characters

Main 
 Colin Farrell as Oswald "Oz" Cobblepot / Penguin:A disfigured crime lord and the former chief lieutenant of the late crime boss Carmine Falcone who is on the rise to becoming a criminal kingpin in his own right. Farrell said the series would further explore the character's "awkwardness, and his strength, and his villainy" as well as the "heartbroken man inside there" beyond his introduction in The Batman (2022).
 Cristin Milioti as Sofia Falcone: A daughter of Carmine Falcone who fights Cobblepot for control of Gotham City's criminal underworld after her father's death.

Recurring 
 Clancy Brown as Salvatore Maroni: A mob boss and gangster in Gotham City whose operation ended in Gotham's historic drug bust, in which Carmine Falcone was the informant.
 Michael Zegen as Alberto Falcone: The son of Carmine Falcone and brother of Sofia.

Additionally, Rhenzy Feliz, Michael Kelly, Shohreh Aghdashloo, Deirdre O'Connell, James Madio, Scott Cohen, and Theo Rossi have been cast in undisclosed roles, with Feliz's role being described as a lead character.

Episodes 

The series will consist of eight episodes, which were written by Lauren LeFranc, with Craig Zobel directing the first three episodes.

Production

Development 
By September 2021, HBO Max was in early development on a spin-off series from the film The Batman (2022) focusing on the character Oswald "Oz" Cobblepot / Penguin. The Batman director Matt Reeves had suggested to studio executives that a sequel film could explore the Penguin further, but they wanted to use the idea for a spin-off series instead. Lauren LeFranc was hired to write the series, while Reeves and The Batman producer Dylan Clark were set as executive producers. They had previously begun development on another spin-off series focused on the Gotham City Police Department, but by early March 2022 that series had been put on hold in favor of spin-offs focused on existing comic book characters; of these, the Penguin series was the furthest along in development at that time. Reeves was unsure then whether he would be directing the series, which he said would come before a sequel to The Batman and could tie-into that potential second film. Soon after, following The Batman release, the limited series received a straight-to-series order from HBO Max using the working title The Penguin, with LeFranc confirmed to serve as showrunner and executive producer. 6th & Idaho's Daniel Pipski and Adam Kassan were also set as executive producers, along with Rafi Crohn as a co-executive producer.

Star Colin Farrell said in July 2022 that Reeves would not be directing the series but was providing guidance on the structure of the scripts and was involved in choosing who would direct them. In October, Craig Zobel was hired to direct the first three episodes of the series and to serve as an executive producer. It was unclear then if Reeves' future DC projects for a planned The Batman shared universe would be placed under the control of James Gunn and Peter Safran, heads of the then-recently announced DC Studios that was set to lead DC's film and television projects, or under the supervision of Warner Bros. Pictures co-chairmen Michael De Luca and Pamela Abdy. Gunn confirmed soon after that DC Studios would oversee all DC productions, and had contacted Reeves about his projects by then. When announcing the first projects for the new DC franchise the DC Universe (DCU) in January 2023, Gunn said any project that did not fit into the DCU's shared universe would be labeled as "DC Elseworlds" moving forward. This is the same as how DC Comics uses the Elseworlds imprint to mark comic books that are separate from the main continuity. Reeves' Batman shared universe was set to be a part of this label, including The Penguin. Bill Carraro was set as an executive producer by the following month. The series consists of eight episodes, totaling approximately six-to-eight hours of content.

Writing 
The series begins one week after the events of The Batman, following the flooding of Gotham City as depicted at the end of the film, which Farrell said made for a "very tricky, very dark story". The series occurs shortly before the events of the film's sequel The Batman – Part II (2025), establishing a "little fabric" of plans that would lead into the sequel. Clark said it would show Oz's rise to power and compared the series to Scarface (1983). He added that the series was intended to be a standalone story from The Batman, and would enhance the experience of watching the film. Reeves cited The Long Good Friday (1980) as an additional influence, and said the series was about the American Dream, with Oz being "underestimated... nobody thinks he's capable of doing anything [but he] believes in himself with a visceral violence". LeFranc had written the pilot script by early March 2022, when the story for the first season had been finished, in addition to writing the other episodes. Farrell read the first episode by mid-October 2022 and called it tasty and unusual, and was excited to further explore the "bang up of Oz" that Reeves envisioned for the character. He was set to read the second and third episodes the following week. Sarah Aubrey, the head of originals for HBO Max, said the goal for the series was to explore Oz's life that is rooted in the streets of Gotham and described him as "a hustler and a strategist with his own ambitions".

Casting 
By the time development was revealed to be underway on the series in September 2021, Colin Farrell had been approached about reprising his role as Penguin from The Batman, but was not contractually obligated to reprise his role. By December, Farrell officially signed on to star in the series and executive produce it. He described working with LeFranc as a similarly collaborative experience to working with Reeves on The Batman. In March 2022, Reeves said there was potential for other characters from the film to appear in the series. At the end of October, Cristin Milioti was cast as the female lead Sofia Falcone. In February 2023, Rhenzy Feliz was cast in a lead role, which was believed to be a teenager who befriends Cobblepot and becomes his driver, while Michael Kelly, Shohreh Aghdashloo, and Deirdre O'Connell were also cast in undisclosed roles. Clancy Brown was cast the following month in the recurring role of Salvatore Maroni. Later that month, Michael Zegen, James Madio, Scott Cohen, and Theo Rossi were cast in recurring roles, with Zegen reportedly portraying Alberto Falcone.

Design 
Farrell said Mike Marino, the makeup designer for The Batman, would return for the series, and he felt the makeup was subtlety perfected more, allowing for him to freely explore beyond his facial features.

Filming 
Principal photography began on March 1, 2023, in New York City, using the working title Boss. It is expected to occur over five or six months, to last until mid-2023.

Release 
The Penguin will be released on the streaming service HBO Max, and will consist of eight episodes.

References

External links 
 

2020s American drama television series
2020s crime drama television series
American action television series
American television spin-offs
English-language television shows
HBO Max original programming
Television series by Warner Bros. Television Studios
Television shows based on DC Comics
Television shows filmed in New York City
Upcoming television series